is a Japanese voice actor and narrator. He is a graduate of Tamagawa University and is affiliated with Aoni Production.

He is most known for the roles of Announcer Yoshigai in Ultimate Muscle (Kinnikuman Nisei), the narrator and Smoker (2nd voice) in One Piece, and Wolf O'Donnell in Star Fox: Assault and Super Smash Bros. Brawl.

Filmography

Anime television series

Aoki Densetsu Shoot! (1993) (Announcer)
Gulliver Boy (1995) (Narration)
H2 (1995) (Announcer)
GeGeGe no Kitaro (4th series) (Kobayashi)

1989

 Kariage-kun - Doctor

1999
One Piece - Smoker (2nd Voice), Pandaman, Ness, Pagaya, Big Pan, Bas, Guile, Ryudo, Narration

2000
Legendary Gambler Tetsuya - Man A

2002
Witch Hunter Robin - Akio Kurosawa
Kinnikuman Nisei - Narration, Announcer, Geronimo, Gorgeousman, Canadian Boy, Gankyu

2005
Doraemon - Yoshio Minamoto

2008
GeGeGe no Kitaro (5th series) - Old man at Izakaya, Muddy Boy
Hakaba Kitaro - Underground Mizuki

2010
Kaidan Restaurant - House Owner

2014

 Marvel Disk Wars: The Avengers - T'Challa / Black Panther

2017

 Marvel Future Avengers - T'Challa / Black Panther

Unknown date
Brain Powered - Firefighter
Chō Mashin Eiyūden Wataru - Hoshio
Cho Mashin Hero Wataru - Hoshio
Chūka Ichiban - Junshin
Danshi Koukousei no Nichijou - RPG Narrator
Kindaichi Case Files - Yuichiro Hayami, Toyohiro Soga
Marmalade Boy - Takemura Producer
Record of Lodoss War: Chronicles of the Heroic Knight - Hoppu, Narration
Shinken Densetsu Tight Road - Klaus Dagattsu
Slam Dunk - Judo Staff
Yu-Gi-Oh! - Yellow Spider Jiro

Original video animation (OVA)
Mobile Suit Gundam: The 08th MS Team (xxxx) - Gau Pilot
Suika (xxxx) - Alchimedis
One Piece Film: Strong World (xxxx) - Narration

Anime film
Kindaichi Case Files: The New Opera House Killer (xxxx) - Seiji Makube
Kinnikuman Nisei series (xxxx-xx) - Announcer
Memories (1995) - Voice
One Piece film series (2000–present) - Narration
Sailor Moon R: The Movie (1993) - Newscaster

Tokusatsu
Heisei Ultra Seven (xxxx) - Alien Valkyrie

Video games
2004

 Ace Combat 5: The Unsung War - AWACS Thunderhead

2005

 Castlevania: Curse of Darkness - Dracula
 Star Fox Assault - Wolf O'Donnell
Tales of Legendia - Stingle/Arnold Alcott

2007

 Bladestorm: The Hundred Years' War - Philip Lu Bon

2008

 Super Smash Bros. Brawl - Wolf O'Donnell

2011
 Warriors Orochi 4 - Hundun

2013

 Warriors Orochi 3 Ultimate - Hundun

2018

Warriors Orochi 4 - Hundun

Unknown date

Blood+ Final Piece (Guy)
Fragile: Sayonara Tsuki no Haikyo 
Gungrave O.D. (Don Corceone)
JoJo'S Bizarre Adventure: Phantom Blood (Narration)
Kinnikuman series 
Kinnikuman Nisei: New Generation vs. Legends (Announcer, Pandaman)
Kinnikuman Generations (Geronimo, Announcer)
Kinnikuman Muscle Generations (Geronimo, Announcer)
Kinnikuman Muscle Grand Prix MAX (Geronimo, Planet Kinniku Soldier)
Kinnikuman Muscle Grand Prix 2 (Geronimo)
Gurumin: A Monstrous Adventure (Motoro)
Kessen series
Kessen II (Gan Ning, Liu Zhang)
Kessen III (Mori Yoshinari, Miyoshi Masayasu)
Metal Angel 3 (Carlos Ozaki)
One Piece series Fighting for One Piece (Smoker)One Piece: Gear Spirit (Smoker)One Piece: Grand Battle! (Narration, Pandaman)One Piece: Grand Battle! 2 (Narration, Smoker, Pandaman)One Piece: Grand Battle! 3 (Smoker, Pandaman, Pagaya)One Piece: Oceans Dream! (Smoker Pandaman)One Piece: Pirates' Carnival (Smoker, Pandaman)One Piece: Treasure Battle! (Smoker, Pandaman)One Piece: Unlimited Adventure (Smoker)Private Eye Dol (Jirō Tachibana)Sakigake!! Otokojuku (Zeus)Spiritual Soul (Gurasu)Tales of Innocence (Ruka's father)

Dubbing rolesAgainst the Ropes, Luther Shaw (Omar Epps)Mighty Joe Young'', Professor Gregory O'Hara (Bill Paxton)

References

External links
Mahito Ōba at Aoni Production
 Mahito Ōba at GamePlaza-Haruka Voice Acting Database 
 Mahito Ōba at Hitoshi Doi's Seiyuu Database 

Japanese male video game actors
Japanese male voice actors
Male voice actors from Hokkaido
1961 births
Living people
Aoni Production voice actors
20th-century Japanese male actors
21st-century Japanese male actors